Nasim Zehra (Urdu:نسیم زہرہ) is a Pakistani journalist and writer who hosts a primetime current affairs talkshow on Channel 24.

Education and career
Zehra studied business at the Quaid-e-Azam University, Pakistan and later studied diplomacy at the Fletcher School at Tufts University in 1989. She worked as a development practitioner, working with the Canadian International Development Agency and Swiss Agency for Development and Cooperation. Zehra served as a visiting lecturer at the School of Advanced International Studies at the Johns Hopkins University in 2006, and later at the Quaid-e-Azam University in 2010.

She joined Dunya News in November 2008 as an anchor and hosted the TV program Policy Matters until February 2013. During that time, she interviewed several national and global leaders including Michael Mullen. In April 2013, she moved to Capital TV and became the channel's current affairs editor. She left Capital TV in October 2014. In September 2015, she joined National University of Sciences and Technology as a visiting professor and remained in that position until February 2016. In October 2014, she joined Channel 24. In 2018, she released the book From Kargil to the coup: Events that shook Pakistan, which chronicles the context of the Kargil conflict and its consequences on India–Pakistan relations. At the book launching ceremony, a panel of journalists and people familiar with foreign policy and military affairs of Pakistan discussed the book including journalists Arif Nizami, Sohail Warraich and former Foreign Secretary Salman Bashir.

Bibliography 
From Kargil to the coup : events that shook Pakistan, 2018.

See also 
 List of Pakistani journalists
 Dunya News

References

External links 
Books by Nasim Zehra on goodreads.com website

Pakistani women journalists
Pakistani television talk show hosts
Harvard University staff
Johns Hopkins University faculty
Quaid-i-Azam University alumni
Living people
1959 births
The Fletcher School at Tufts University alumni
Academic staff of the National University of Sciences & Technology